Antonela Lucía Mena (born 28 March 1988) is an Argentine handball player for CID Moreno and the Argentina national team.

She participated at the 2011 World Women's Handball Championship in Brazil.

Individual awards

Best Pivot of Pan American Championship in 2009, 2015 and 2017
Best Pivot of South and Central American Championship in 2022

References

External links

1988 births
Living people
Sportspeople from Buenos Aires
Argentine female handball players
Handball players at the 2016 Summer Olympics
Olympic handball players of Argentina
Handball players at the 2007 Pan American Games
Handball players at the 2011 Pan American Games
Handball players at the 2015 Pan American Games
Handball players at the 2019 Pan American Games
Pan American Games medalists in handball
Pan American Games bronze medalists for Argentina
Pan American Games silver medalists for Argentina
Expatriate handball players
Argentine expatriate sportspeople in Spain
Medalists at the 2007 Pan American Games
Medalists at the 2015 Pan American Games
Medalists at the 2019 Pan American Games
Medalists at the 2011 Pan American Games
21st-century Argentine women
20th-century Argentine women
South American Games bronze medalists for Argentina
South American Games medalists in handball
Competitors at the 2022 South American Games